Waswanipi is a Cree village municipality in the territory of Eeyou Istchee in northern Quebec; it has a distinct legal status and classification from other kinds of village municipalities in Quebec: Naskapi village municipalities, northern villages (Inuit communities), and ordinary villages.

As with all other Cree village municipalities in Quebec, there is a counterpart Cree reserved land of the same name located nearby: Waswanipi.

Despite the title of "village municipality" and the formalities that go along with it (for instance, having a mayor), Statistics Canada lists it (and all other Cree village municipalities in Quebec) as having no resident population or residential infrastructure (dwellings); it is the Cree reserved lands that are listed as having population and residential dwellings in the 2011 census, the 2006 census, and earlier censuses.

Demographics 

References

Cree village municipalities in Quebec
Populated places established in 1978
1978 establishments in Quebec